The 2015 African Olympic Qualifier was the third edition of the African Olympic Qualifier for Men and Women. It was held from 23 October to 1 November 2015 in Randburg, South Africa. Nine teams competed in the men's and seven in the women's tournament. The winner of the tournament qualified for the 2016 Summer Olympics.

On 30 October South African Sports Confederation and Olympic Committee (SASCOC) published a statement reiterating that it will not consider qualifying though the continental qualifying tournament acceptable. SASCOC and the South African Hockey Association had previously specified 2014-15 FIH Hockey World League as the only Olympic selection route for the South Africa men's and women's national field hockey teams.

All times are local (UTC+2).

Men's tournament

Preliminary round

Group A

Group B

Knockout stage

7–9th place semifinal

Semifinals

Seventh place game

Fifth place game

Third place game

Final

Final standings

Goalscorers

Women's tournament

Pool

Results

Goalscorers

References

External links
FIH.com (Men)
FIH.com (Women)

African Olympic Qualifier
African Olympic Qualifier
2015 African Olympic Qualifier
African Olympic Qualifier
October 2015 sports events in Africa
November 2015 sports events in Africa
Field hockey at the Summer Olympics – African qualification